Hart Junior/Senior High School is a public high school located in Hart, Texas (USA) and classified as a 1A school by the UIL. It is part of the Hart Independent School District located in central Castro County. In 2015, the school was rated "Improvement Required" by the Texas Education Agency.

Athletics
The Hart Longhorns compete in these sports - 

Basketball
Cross Country
6-Man Football
Golf
Tennis
Track and Field

State Titles
Boys Cross Country - 
2006(1A)

References

External links
Hart ISD
List of Six-man football stadiums in Texas

Schools in Castro County, Texas
Public high schools in Texas
Public middle schools in Texas